Sheikh Mohammed  bin Hamad bin Abdullah bin Jassim bin Mohammed  Al Thani (1929–) was the son of Sheikh Hamad bin Abdullah Al Thani.

Career
 Ambassador to Lebanon 1973–1977
 Minister for Education 1978–1989
 Minister of State for Culture 1989–1995

Qatar coup
He went into exile in 1995 after Hamad bin Khalifa's coup to join his brother, Khalifa bin Hamad Al Thani, in United Arab Emirates. He returned to Qatar in 1996.

Children 

 Hamad bin Mohammed , married daughter of his uncle Nasir bin Hamad, 3 sons and 3 daughters
 Abdulaziz bin Mohammed , married daughter of his uncle Abdulrahman bin Hamad, 2 sons and 3 daughters
 Jassim bin Mohammed , 2 sons and 2 daughters
 Maryam bint Mohammed , married the Emir  Hamad bin Khalifa, 2 sons and  6 daughters
 Galiya bint Mohammed , Minister of Health, married Khalid bin Muhammed bin Hasan, 3 sons and 3 daughter
 Shiekha bint Mohammed , married Saud bin Abdelaziz bin Hamad, 3 sons and 2 daughters
 Lubna bint Mohammed , married Muhammed bin Khalid bin Hamad, 2 sons and 1 daughter
 Noora bint Mohammed , married Naif bin Suhaim bin Hamad, 1 son and 1 daughter
 Aisha bint Mohammed , married Thani bin Thamir bin Mohammed , 3 sons and 1 daughter

References
 http://www.althanitree.com/pageTemplate.aspx?show=g&id=778&action=0
 http://www.mbhhc.com/Links2.aspx?group_key=board_of_governors 

House of Thani
Qatari exiles
Ambassadors of Qatar to Lebanon
1934 births
Living people
Government ministers of Qatar
Qatari expatriates in Saudi Arabia